Tiefenbach is an Ortsgemeinde – a municipality belonging to a Verbandsgemeinde, a kind of collective municipality – in the Rhein-Hunsrück-Kreis (district) in Rhineland-Palatinate, Germany. It belongs to the Verbandsgemeinde Simmern-Rheinböllen, whose seat is in Simmern. Today's Tiefenbach grew together from two centres named Untertiefenbach and Obertiefenbach.

Geography

Location
The municipality lies in the Hunsrück roughly 5 km south of Simmern and 9 km east of Kirchberg. To the east and south lies the Soonwald, a heavily wooded section of the west-central Hunsrück.

History
Tiefenbach's early history is linked with the Wildburg (castle), which had its first documentary mention in 1253. Later, Tiefenbach, which lay at the northern foot of the Soonwald, was part of Palatinate-Simmern, which in 1556 introduced the Reformation. In 1673, the village passed to the Electorate of the Palatinate. Beginning in 1794, Tiefenbach lay under French rule. In 1815 it was assigned to the Kingdom of Prussia at the Congress of Vienna. In 1912, a Catholic chapel was built. After the First World War, the village was once again occupied by the French for a time. In the 1930s, the local ore mine, "Märkerei", was shut down. Since 1946, Tiefenbach has been part of the then newly founded state of Rhineland-Palatinate. In 1961, the Evangelical church was built.

In 1921, Tiefenbach was linked to the railway network, complete with a station. This line, running between Simmern and Gemünden, was abandoned in 1963; by 1965, all the tracks had been torn up. Until 2006, there was still a viaduct on the former line, but this had by then fallen into such disrepair that it was decided to demolish it with explosives. The old railway embankment northeast of Tiefenbach has, however, been preserved. The last road underpass on this embankment was demolished in 2009.

Politics

Municipal council
The council is made up of 12 council members, who were elected by proportional representation at the municipal election held on 7 June 2009, and the honorary mayor as chairman.

The municipal election held on 7 June 2009 yielded the following results:

Mayor
Tiefenbach's mayor is Thorsten Fuchs.

Coat of arms
The municipality's arms might be described thus: A closet and an endorse, couped at the upper end at the closet, Or between, in dexter, sable an arming buckle argent and in sinister sable a lion rampant of the first armed and langued gules, in chief bendy lozengy of the third and azure with a hammer and pick per saltire to dexter of the second.

The top of the escutcheon bears the "bendy lozengy" pattern (that is, slanted diamonds) once also borne by the Electorate of the Palatinate. This is charged with a hammer and pick, which stand for the iron mining formerly done here. The Palatine Lion on the sinister (armsbearer's left, viewer's right) side is likewise a reference to the village's former allegiance to the Electorate of the Palatinate. The silver buckle on the dexter (armsbearer's right, viewer's left) side stands for the Barons of Schmidtburg, waldgraves who had several holdings in the village. 

The arms have been borne since 22 September 1980.

Culture and sightseeing

Buildings
The following are listed buildings or sites in Rhineland-Palatinate's Directory of Cultural Monuments:
 Hauptstraße – bakehouse (Duhle Backes), one-floor plastered building, 19th century
 Hauptstraße 9 – timber-frame house, partly solid or slated, 19th century
 Hauptstraße 10 – timber-frame house, half-hipped roof, first third of the 19th century
 Hauptstraße 28 – estate complex along the street; timber-frame, partly solid or slated, latter half of the 19th century, timber-frame barn, partly solid, late 19th century

Tiefenbach also has two churches, a Madonna figure standing on the slope, an old ore mine and the Wildburg (castle).

Village life
The Wildburghalle was built in 1988 as a multipurpose hall. Several clubs, among them the sport club, a motor sport club and the volunteer fire brigade, shape social and cultural life in the village. Also, there is an Evangelical kindergarten.

Economy and infrastructure

Tourism
The Schinderhannes-Soonwald-Radweg (cycle path) from Gemünden to Simmern runs through the village. Farther away is the newly blazed Soonwaldsteig hiking trail.

Further reading
 Fritz Schellack, "Chronik Tiefenbach", Herausgeber: Ortsgemeinde Tiefenbach, Böhmer Druck Service, Tiefenbach/Simmern 2007

References

Rhein-Hunsrück-Kreis